The 1940 Howard Bulldogs football team was an American football team that represented Howard College (now known as the Samford University) as a member of the Dixie Conference during the 1940 college football season. In their first year under head coach William C. White, the team compiled a 4–5 record.

Schedule

References

Howard
Samford Bulldogs football seasons
Howard Bulldogs football